Nice Shoes is a creative studio with locations in New York, Toronto, Boston, Chicago, and Minneapolis; specializing in production and post-production for commercials, web content, film, television, and music videos. Nice Shoes has worked on spots and campaigns for a variety of clients, such as Under Armour, IBM, Frontline, Estee Lauder, and Comedy Central. The studio has a history of delivering award-winning work, most recently collaborating with Digitas to craft the Take It From A Fish campaign for Astrazeneca, the 2015 Grand Prix Lion winner in the Cannes Lions 'Pharma' category.

In 2020, Nice Shoes opened up an experimental division where they hired Ninaad Kulkarni, an animation filmmaker, mixed media 3D artist, and vivid storyteller, as the creative director.

Recent work 
Nice Shoes has recently crafted end titles for Universal Studios' hit film Pitch Perfect 2  and aided filmmakers Josh and Benny Safdie in developing a look for the festival-winning Heaven Knows What. The studio has also developed a proprietary remote collaboration technology, with partnerships in Atlanta, Austin, Boston, Dallas, Detroit, Los Angeles, and Miami, extending Nice Shoes' reach throughout North America.

References

Visual effects companies
Graphic design studios
Companies based in New York City
American animation studios
Mass media companies established in 1996
Television and film post-production companies